Chad Blake Keegan (born 30 July 1979) is a South African cricketer.

Early career and injuries
Born in Johannesburg, Keegan attended Durban High School. He suffered several injuries in 2004, a year after being voted Middlesex Player of the Year, including a double stress-fracture and sensitive joints. As a consequence, he found himself having to totally remodel his bowling action. Injury once again ruled him out of the majority of the 2005 season, before enforcing his premature retirement aged 28, in November 2007.

Recent career
During 2009, Chad played for Henley – on – Thames Cricket club first team, and hit 100+ in 64 balls. He also coaches there with level 4 coach Chris Ellison. In 2009, he was given a trial by Sussex, and played for their 2nd XI. He played for the first team in the Friends Provident Trophy against Surrey. Sussex lost the match, but Chad Keegan bowled seven overs, getting 2 wickets for 53 runs, and scoring 38 runs with the bat, at around about a run-a-ball.

External links
 Profile, cricketarchive.com 
 Profile, ecb.co.uk
 Keegan retires through injury, archive.org
 Profile, cricinfo.com

References

1979 births
Living people
Middlesex cricketers
South African cricketers
Sussex cricketers
Oxfordshire cricketers